Scinax lindsayi is a species of frog in the family Hylidae.
It is found in Brazil, Colombia, and possibly Venezuela.
Its natural habitats are subtropical or tropical moist lowland forests and intermittent freshwater marshes.
It is threatened by habitat loss.

References

lindsayi
Amphibians of Brazil
Amphibians of Colombia
Amphibians described in 1992
Taxonomy articles created by Polbot